Henry Home-Drummond FRSE FSA (28 July 1783 – 12 September 1867) was a Scottish politician, advocate, landowner and agricultural improver.

Life

He was born on 28 July 1783, the son of George Home Drummond of Blair Drummond and his wife (and cousin) Janet Jardine, daughter of Rev John Jardine minister of the Tron Kirk and Dean of the Chapel Royal. 

He was educated at the High School in Edinburgh and then studied aw at the University of Oxford graduating with a BCL in 1809. The family were one of the first to occupy the new houses in Edinburgh's New Town, living in a townhouse at 128 Princes Street, facing onto Edinburgh Castle in addition to their other estates. His father had a similar house at 110 Princes Street.

Home-Drummond was called to the Scottish Bar in 1808, and later served as Vice-Lieutenant of Perthshire.

He was elected a Fellow of the Royal Society of Edinburgh in 1815. His proposers were John Playfair, George Steuart Mackenzie and Macvey Napier.

He sat as Member of Parliament for Stirlingshire from 1821 to 1831 and for Perthshire as a Conservative from 1840 to 1852.

In 1833 his address is listed as 28 Princes Street in Edinburgh's New Town. His country seat is shown as Blair Drummond.

He is buried in Kincardine-in-Menteith in the Home-Drummond grave, just west of Blair Drummond.

Publications

On Wedge-Draining Clay Land
On the Salmon Fishery
 On Sawdust as Manure

Family

On 14 April 1812 he married Christian Moray of Abercairney (died 1864). She was the eldest daughter of Charles Moray Stirling. They had a daughter who later became Anne Murray, Duchess of Atholl, and two sons, George Stirling Home Drummond FRSE and Charles Stirling Home Drummond Moray of Abercairney.

References

Oliver & Boyd's new Edinburgh almanac and national repository for the year 1850. Oliver & Boyd, Edinburgh, 1850
K. D. Reynolds, Murray, Anne, duchess of Atholl (1814–1897), Oxford Dictionary of National Biography, Oxford University Press

External links 
 

1783 births
1867 deaths
Members of the Parliament of the United Kingdom for Scottish constituencies
UK MPs 1820–1826
UK MPs 1826–1830
UK MPs 1830–1831
UK MPs 1837–1841
UK MPs 1841–1847
UK MPs 1847–1852
Deputy Lieutenants of Perthshire
Members of the Faculty of Advocates
Fellows of the Royal Society of Edinburgh